Geoff Bagnall (born 4 November 1965) is a former professional rugby league footballer who played in the 1980s and 1990s.

Playing career

County Cup Final appearances
Bagnall played , and scored a try in Wakefield Trinity's 29–16 victory over Sheffield Eagles in the 1992–93 Yorkshire County Cup Final during the 1992–93 season at Elland Road, Leeds on Sunday 18 October 1992.

References

External links

1965 births
Living people
Australian rugby league players
Australian expatriate sportspeople in England
Gold Coast Chargers players
Place of birth missing (living people)
Rugby league halfbacks
Wakefield Trinity players